Catasetum randii is a species of orchid found in Brazil.

References

External links

randii
Orchids of Brazil
Plants described in 1894